Bassel al-Assad Swimming Complex is a swimming centre in Aleppo, Syria, featuring an indoor Olympic-size swimming pool with a seating capacity of 1,100 spectators. The complex was opened in 1998, and re-constructed in 2010 at a cost of US$ 10 million.

Facilities
Indoor Olympic swimming pool.
Indoor tennis court.
Ice-skating hall.
Bowling saloon.
2 squash halls.
Fitness centre.

August 2013 bombing
On 22 August 2013, a suicide bomber belonging to the Syrian armed opposition has targeted a students' gathering in one of the restaurants of the complex. As a result of the bombing, 10 people were killed, including teenage girls and male journalists. More than 20 were seriously wounded.

References

Sports venues in Aleppo
Swimming venues in Syria
Sports venues completed in 1998